Vincenzo Lancia (24 August 1881 – 15 February 1937) was an Italian racing driver, engineer and founder of Lancia.

Vincenzo Lancia was born in the small village of Fobello on 24 August 1881, close to Turin; his family tree starts in Fabello around 1550. He was the youngest of four children (one sister and two brothers), his father being a soup canner who made his money in Argentina before returning to Turin to start his business. From an early age, Vincenzo showed a gift with numbers, and it was intended for him to become a bookkeeper, but developed an interest in machinery and engineering, and was fascinated with the new motor car.

He eventually became an apprentice with Giovanni Battista Ceirano, a bicycle importer in Turin, and he was named bookkeeper in the company's brochure in 1898. He was also developing his skills at engineering, design and construction, and developed patience, perseverance and determination. Soon he could tackle most problems single-handedly.

Once Lancia was sent to help Count Carlo Biscaretti di Ruffia, who owned a Benz. When they met in February 1899, they quickly became friends. He was to become important in Lancia's later career, and was credited with the design of the now familiar Lancia logo (1911).

 Lancia, however, was now chief inspector at Fiat, and was also test driver, although only 19. His driving impressed the Fiat bosses, and he was invited to drive their cars in races, and his first success was in 1900, in Fiat's second race. Lancia led the first lap of first French Grand Prix at Le Mans with a time of 53 minutes 42 seconds. He was an exceptionally fast driver, often fastest of all, but often suffered a mechanical failure.  In 1906, Vincenzo Lancia won the Gold Cup in Milan driving the Fiat 28-40 HP.

His first car was built in 1907 - the 12 hp Alfa, which included much of the technology now taken for granted, and he produced groundbreaking models such as the Lambda and the Aprilia.
In 1930, with Gaspare Bona, Battista Farina called Pinin, Giovanni Battista Devalle, Pietro Monateri, Arrigo De Angeli founded the Pininfarina S.p.A. a car design firm and coachbuilder, with headquarters in Cambiano, Turin, Italy SpA.
He died from a heart attack on 15 February 1937 just before the Aprilia was put into full production.   He was 55 years old, and he lies buried at Fobello. His wife Adele Miglietti and their son Gianni Lancia continued the management of the car manufacturer (1937–1955).

References

 Lancia Motor Club (UK)
 Vincenzo Lancia (VanderbiltCupRaces.com)

1881 births
1937 deaths
Sportspeople from the Province of Vercelli
Lancia
Lancia people
Italian automotive pioneers
Italian founders of automobile manufacturers
Italian racing drivers